Kuara may refer to:

Kuara, the god of thunder in Turkic Shamanism also known as Kvara
Kuara (Sumer), an ancient Sumerian city on the mouth of the Euphrates River, located in modern-day Iraq
Kuara, West Bengal, a village in West Bengal
Kuara (river), a river in Sverdlovsk Oblast, Russia